ʿAbdallāh ibn al-Zubayr al-Ḥumaydī (died 834) was a hafiz, faqih from Shafi'i jurisprudence scholar and Shaykh of the al-Haram. He studied under Imam Shafi'i himself in his majlis. He also studied and narrated hadith from Sufyan ibn Uyainah and Fudhail ibn Iyadh. His pupils included Al-Aimah such as Al-Bukhari, An-Nasa'i, At-Turmudhi, Abu Zur'a al-Razi and Abu Hatim al-Razi. He died in Mecca in 219 AH.

His Writings
Some of his writing are:
 Al-Musnad (المسند) ;  his major work. 
 Uṣūl al-Sunnah (أصول السنة), 
 Ar-Radd ‘Ala an-Nu’man (Refutation of Abu Hanifa)
 At-Tafsir
 Ad-Dala’il

References 

Bibliography
 Adh-Dhahabi, Siyar A’laam an-Nubalaa (10/616-621) 
 Adh-Dhahabi, Tadhkirat ul-Huffaadh (2/413-414),
 Al-Mizzi, at-Tahdheeb (14/512).

Shafi'is
Atharis
Hadith narrators
Hadith scholars
People from Mecca
Quraysh
9th-century jurists